Ghode Jatra(Nepali:घोडे जात्रा) is a horse festival native to Kathmandu. The festival occurs annually on mid March or early April.

In the festival, a horse parades is organized in Tundikhel. The parade and competitions is carried out in the presence of heads of state. Nepal Army organizes the parade and competitions.

Newar people mark the festival with a feast. There is a public holiday in Kathmandu on the day of Ghode Jatra.

Origin
In the inner city of Kathmandu, whenever children disappeared, it was assumed that demons or cannibals did it. In order to scare off the bad spirits, campers in Tudikhel who had horses with them, were asked to run those horses around Tudikhel to scare off the demons. People gathered and fed the demons near the tree that is still located in the middle of Tudikhel. The ritual later took a form of festival. The tradition later changed into a national festival.

See also
List of festivals in Nepal

References

Festivals in Nepal